Craighouse is the main settlement and capital of the Scottish Inner Hebridean island of Jura, in Argyll and Bute. In 1971 it had a population of 113. The village is situated on the sheltered east coast of the island at the southern end of Small Isles Bay.

Since 2007, a passenger-only ferry service between Craighouse and Tayvallich on the Scottish mainland has operated during the summer months. This service was resurrected by the community after several decades without a direct mainland ferry.

Vehicular access to the island now via a small ferry between Feolin on Jura ( south of Craighouse via road) and Port Askaig on neighbouring Islay.

Facilities in Craighouse
Today Craighouse is the social centre of the island and is home to:

 Jura Community Shop, (Post Office, provisions, general goods) 
 The Jura Hotel
 The Antlers Cafe
 Community run diesel and petrol pumps
 Whisky Island Gallery (photography) 
 Deer Island Distillery, producing Jura's only rum
 Camella Crafts (local crafts)
 Jura Distillery, producer of Isle of Jura Single Malt Whisky
 Jura Service Point (archives, oral history recordings, photocopying, printing, meeting rooms)
 Small Isles Primary School
 Jura Parish Church
 The Village hall

History 
The name "Craighouse" means "The house by the rock".

References and footnotes

External links

Villages on Jura, Scotland